Stephen S. Hershey Jr. (born May 2, 1964) is an American Republican politician currently serving in his 2nd term in the Maryland State Senate, representing Legislative District 36, Maryland's Upper Eastern Shore which includes Caroline, Cecil, Kent & Queen Anne's Counties.

Hershey served as the Senate Minority Whip from 2015 until 2020. He was replaced as Senate Minority Whip by Michael Hough. Before being appointed to the Senate in 2013, he served 2 years in the Maryland House of Delegates.

Early life
Hershey grew up in Bowie, Maryland and attended Bowie High School. He went on to James Madison University for two years and then transferred to Catholic University of America.  He earned his B.C.E. in Civil Engineering from the Catholic University in 1987.  In 2002, he received his MBA from George Washington University.

Career
Steve Hershey was elected to the Maryland State House of Delegates in 2010 representing District 36. He was a member of the House Environmental Matters Committee where he served on the Banking, Economic development, Science and Technology Subcommittee. He was also a member of the Business Climate Work Group.

On September 18, 2013, he was appointed to the Maryland State Senate by Governor Martin O'Malley following the retirement of the Senator E. J. Pipkin.  He was sworn into the Senate on October 1, 2013

In the Senate, Hershey serves on the Senate Finance Committee, where he sits on the Health Policy Subcommittee.  He is also a member of the Rules and Executive Nominations Committee, Legislative Policy Committee and the Joint Committee on Legislative Ethics.  Senator Hershey is also on the Maryland Economic Development and Business Climate Commission and is a member of the Strategic Energy Investment Advisory Board and the Maryland Offshore Wind Business Development Advisory Committee.

In 2015, Hershey was elected by his peers to serve as Minority Whip in the Senate Republican Caucus, a position he held until 2020.

Under Governor Robert Ehrlich’s Administration, he served as Assistant Secretary of the Department of Natural Resources and Assistant Secretary of the Department of Planning.

Republican Party activity
In 2014, Hershey served as a member on Governor-elect Larry Hogan’s Transition Team and was a 2012 Delegate at the Republican National Convention.  He served as President of Queen Anne's County Republican Club, 2002–04 and Chair of the Queen Anne's County Tricentennial Celebration Committee, 2004.

In November 2022, Hershey was selected to be the State Senate minority leader, replacing Bryan Simonaire of Anne Arundel County.

Other career
Prior to serving in the Maryland General Assembly, Hershey was Vice President of Project and Development Services at Jones Lang LaSalle, a commercial real estate services company and The Staubach Company.

He also held executive management positions for Trammell Crow Company, Planet Hollywood International and Prime Retail.  Since 2015 he is the owner of a marine construction company based in Ocean City, Maryland.

Awards and honors
Senator Hershey was recently recognized with the Maryland Association of Counties Legislator of the Year award for his work defending local Highway User Revenues.

References

Living people
1964 births
People from Washington, D.C.
Catholic University of America alumni
George Washington University alumni
Republican Party members of the Maryland House of Delegates
Republican Party Maryland state senators
21st-century American politicians